Ascending King is an extreme metal band that originated in Midlothian, Texas.

History
Before forming the project, Aaron Kirby was a member of a metalcore band, called Dryline, from 1999 till 2008. Around this time, Kirby grew in his Christian faith. In 2015, Kirby formed the project Ascending King and became known as Ruah. In 2016, the project joined SkyBurnsBlack Records. Following signing with the label, the band released their debut single, "Genesis of Desolation". During this time, Ruah continued to work on his EP, titled Funeral of Species. In mid-2017, the band signed to Nosral Recordings, the subsidiary of Rottweiler Records. On August 22, 2017, the band released Funeral of a Species, which received good reviews. On September 22, 2017, the band released a lyric video for "Moon for the Dead". On August 2, 2019, the project released a new single, “Lignum Vitae”, which would also feature Sebat of Frost Like Ashes. In January 2020, the band announced their signing to Christian Metal Underground Records, a subsidiary of Vision of God Records.

Discography
 EPs

 Singles
 "Genesis of Desolation" (2016; SkyBurnsBlack Records)
 “Lignum Vitae” (2019; Nosral Recordings)

 Collaborations
 "Drink From The Chalice Of Blood (Horde cover)" - Symphony of Heaven (2018; Nosral Recordings)

 Compilation appearances
 The Bearded Dragon's Sampler (2.0) (2016; The Bearded Dragon Productions)
 Metal from the Dragon (Vol. 2) (2017; The Bearded Dragon Productions)
 Nosral Sampler #1 (2017; Nosral Recordings)

References

External links
Twitter
Instagram
Ascending King (SkyBurnsBlack) on Bandcamp
Ascending King (Nosral Recordings) on Bandcamp

Musical groups established in 2015
American Christian metal musical groups
Unblack metal musical groups
Nosral Recordings artists
Doom metal musical groups
Musical groups from Texas
2015 establishments in Texas